In Greek mythology, Dereites (Ancient Greek: Δηρείτου) or Deritus was a member of the Lacedamonian royal family. He was son of Prince Harpalus, son of King Amyclas of Laconia. Through his son Aeginetes, Dereites was the ancestor of Patreus who founded Patras.

Note

References 

 Pausanias, Description of Greece with an English Translation by W.H.S. Jones, Litt.D., and H.A. Ormerod, M.A., in 4 Volumes. Cambridge, MA, Harvard University Press; London, William Heinemann Ltd. 1918. . Online version at the Perseus Digital Library
 Pausanias, Graeciae Descriptio. 3 vols. Leipzig, Teubner. 1903.  Greek text available at the Perseus Digital Library.

Princes in Greek mythology
Laconian mythology